Mastropietro is an Italian surname. Notable people with the surname include:

Pamela Mastropietro (1999–2018), Italian murder victim
Renato Mastropietro (born 1945), Italian racecar driver

Italian-language surnames